Dundee is an unincorporated community in Geneva County, Alabama, United States. It is located on Alabama State Route 123, and is now included in the city limits of Hartford.

Demographics

Dundee was listed only on the 1900 U.S. Census, shortly after its incorporation. It was disincorporated shortly thereafter.

History
In February 1899, the charter for the incorporation of Dundee was passed by the Alabama Legislature. A post office operated under the name Dundee from 1880 to 1904. Dundee was disincorporated at some point in the early 1900s.

References

Unincorporated communities in Geneva County, Alabama
Unincorporated communities in Alabama